Commonly referred to as the Old World flying squirrels, the genus Pteromys is distributed across temperate Eurasia, the Korean Peninsula and Japan. Although there are a host of flying squirrel genera in Asia (particularly southern Asia), Pteromys is the only one present in Europe.

Characteristics
These large-eyed animals are nocturnal and use a membrane stretching from their wrists to ankles in order to glide from tree to tree. They feed on nuts, seeds, fruit, buds, bark, and insects.

Species
There are two species in this genus:
 Pteromys momonga – Japanese dwarf flying squirrel – Found in Japan (Honshu and Kyushu).
 Pteromys volans – Siberian flying squirrel – Found in northern Europe (mainly Russia and Finland, some isolated populations in the Baltics) and northern Asia from Siberia to Hokkaido

References
 Nowak, Ronald M. 1999. Walker's Mammals of the World, 6th edition. Johns Hopkins University Press, 1936 pp. 

Pteromys
Extant Piacenzian first appearances
Taxa named by Georges Cuvier